Familie Sonnenfeld was a German TV movie series produced from 2005–2008. The series was directed by Christina Kabisch.

Family Sonnenfeld was broadcast on the ARD and ORF.

See also
List of German television series

References

External links
 

2005 German television series debuts
2009 German television series endings
German-language television shows
Das Erste original programming